Laurentius Paulinus Gothus (10 November 1565 – 29 November 1646) was a Swedish theologian, astronomer and Archbishop of Uppsala.

Biography
Gothus  was born Lars Paulsson at Söderköping in Östergötland County, Sweden. In 1588, Gothus travelled to Germany and studied in the Rostock University for three years. He was influenced by Pierre de la Ramée (1515–1572) and his philosophy.

After receiving a Master's degree, he returned  to Uppsala in time for the Uppsala Synod in 1593 where the founding dogmas of the Church of Sweden were made final. He was appointed professor of logic at the recently reopened, and now Lutheran focused, Uppsala University. In 1598 he re-transferred himself to the professorship in astronomy.

He was, along with some other professors, suspended from his duty, because of demands that professors to sign a petition supporting Sigismund III Vasa as king of Sweden. However, in 1604, his Protestant uncle Duke Charles was crowned as King Charles IX of Sweden.  When a comet appeared on the sky in 1607, Laurentius declared he could interpret what this signified.  The belief in astrology and the significance of heavenly signs were still strong.  His interpretations made an impression on  King Charles and he was re-instated him at the university.

Laurentius had acquired a belief in Ramism from the writings French educational reformer Petrus Ramus and defended his views rigorously. Later he was also involved in philosophical disputes with  Jonas Magni Wexionensis (1583–1651)  who was a professor and head of Uppsala University and who was an adherent of Aristotle.

Gothus served as Bishop of the Diocese of Skara (1608–1609) and Bishop of the Diocese of Strängnäs (1609–1637). In 1628, he was tasked with the investigation of the visionary Margareta i Kumla. Her visions and alleged meetings with demons and angels were described by Bishop Gothus in a meeting of the Swedish clergy in 1629.	During the reign of Christina, Queen of Sweden,  Gothus served as Archbishop of Uppsala and Primate of Sweden from 1637 to 1646.

Works
Laurentius wrote many theological and astronomical works and also published calendars.  He furthermore published a thorough Ethica Christiana 1615–30, a work in six parts in Swedish about Lutheranism.  Following this, he in 1631 wrote a summary of this work which has been called the prime catechetical work from 17th century Sweden. He also wrote some historical works about Swedish history.

References 

Lutheran archbishops of Uppsala
17th-century Lutheran archbishops
Rectors of Uppsala University
Swedish Lutheran hymnwriters
1565 births
1646 deaths
16th-century Swedish astronomers
17th-century Swedish writers
17th-century male writers
17th-century Swedish astronomers
Lutheran bishops of Strängnäs
University of Rostock alumni
Swedish male writers
16th-century Protestant theologians
17th-century Protestant theologians
Writers about religion and science